Kal Rural District is a rural district (dehestan) in Eshkanan District, Lamerd County, Fars Province, Iran. At the 2016 census, its population was 5,076, in 1,359 families.  The rural district has 12 villages.

References 

Rural Districts of Fars Province
Lamerd County